Muriel Wallace May  (13 April 1897–11 August 1982) was a New Zealand teacher, school principal and writer. She was born in Dunedin, New Zealand, on 13 April 1897.

In the 1976 New Year Honours, May was appointed an Officer of the Order of the British Empire, for services to education and literature.

References

1897 births
1982 deaths
Scientists from Dunedin
New Zealand women writers
Writers  from Dunedin
New Zealand Officers of the Order of the British Empire